Collix rufidorsata is a moth in the family Geometridae. It was described by Louis Beethoven Prout in 1929. It is found on Java, Borneo, the Bismarck Archipelago and New Guinea.  It has one subspecies, promulgata, which is darker, more reddish-purple, and less markedly banded than the name-typical variety.

Subspecies
Collix rufidorsata rufidorsata (Java, Borneo)
Collix rufidorsata promulgata Prout, 1929 (New Guinea, Bismarck Islands)

References

rufidorsata
Moths described in 1929
Moths of Borneo
Moths of New Guinea
Taxa named by Louis Beethoven Prout